The 1981–82 Boise State Broncos men's basketball team represented Boise State University during the 1981–82 NCAA Division I men's basketball season. The Broncos were led by second-year head coach Dave Leach and played their home games on campus at the Bronco Gymnasium in Boise, Idaho.

This was the last season for varsity basketball at the 1950s Bronco Gym, and its finale against rival Idaho was sold out two weeks in advance. BSU needed a win (with a Weber State loss) to qualify for the Big Sky tourney, for a quick re-match with Idaho six nights later at the Kibbie Dome in Moscow. A record crowd of 3,946 saw the Broncos test the ninth-ranked Vandals, but fell by six; the capacity of the gym at the time was listed at 3,682. The new BSU Pavilion opened in May, for commencement exercises.

No Broncos were named to the all-conference team; forward Eric Bailey, guard Terry Lee, and sophomore swingman Vince Hinchen were honorable mention.

References

External links
Sports Reference – Boise State Broncos – 1981–82 basketball season

Boise State Broncos men's basketball seasons
Boise State
Boise State